Dewerstone is the site of an Iron Age Hill fort on a rocky promontory overlooking the River Plym on the South West edge of Dartmoor to the North of Plympton in Devon. The fort consists of ramparts to the Northern side of the promontory at approx 210 Metres above Sea Level.

"Dewer" is an ancient Celtic word for the Devil, and Dartmoor tradition has it that the Devil, riding a gigantic black horse, gallops across the Moor each night and leads a phantom pack of black hounds to chase weary or foolish humans over the Dewerstone to their deaths. Another legend has it that a shepherd actually saw the black hounds devouring an unfortunate man on his way home from the fields one night.

The area is also popular with climbers, with over 100 climbs listed.

References

Hill forts in Devon